The Kostrad 2nd Infantry Division (Indonesian: Divisi Infanteri 2 Kostrad) abbreviated "Divif 2/Kostrad" , is an army strategic reserves command division of the Indonesian Army. The divisional commander is a two-star Major General. The division's headquarters are in Malang (East Java).

The division contains multiple Army combat units including Infantry (Airborne, Mechanized, and Raider), Cavalry (now can be categorized as Armor units), Artillery, and other support units.

Like the 1st Division, this division is known as a combined arms division part of Kostrad within the Indonesian Army.

The first Kostrad division to be activated, it traces its origins to Decree of Chief of Staff of the Army KPTS 342/4/1961 dated 17 April 1961 by Chief of Staff GEN Abdul Haris Nasution, since then marked as the division's Raising Day.

Organization 
  The division is composed of 3 Infantry Brigades, 1 Artillery Regiment and supporting elements including independent Battalion units, and Company.

See also
1st Kostrad Infantry Division
3rd Kostrad Infantry Division

Notes

Further reading
'Indonesia: Keeping its forces at full stretch,' Jane's Defence Weekly, 15 April 1998, p. 34-35

External links
http://kostrad.mil.id/divisi-2/
https://www.divif2kostrad.com/

Divisions of Indonesia
Infantry divisions
Military units and formations established in 1961
Indonesian Army